Automatic transmission fluid (ATF) is a type of hydraulic fluid used in vehicles with automatic transmissions. It is typically coloured red or green to distinguish it from motor oil and other fluids in the vehicle.

The fluid is optimized for the special requirements of a transmission, such as valve operation, brake band friction, and the torque converter, as well as gear lubrication.

ATF is also used as a hydraulic fluid in some power steering systems, as a lubricant in some 4WD transfer cases, and in some modern manual transmissions.

Modern use
Modern ATF consists of a base oil plus an additive package containing a wide variety of chemical compounds intended to provide the required properties of a particular ATF specification. Most ATFs contain some combination of additives that improve lubricating qualities, such as anti-wear additives, rust and corrosion inhibitors, detergents, dispersants and surfactants (which protect and clean metal surfaces); kinematic viscosity and viscosity index improvers and modifiers, seal swell additives and agents (which extend the rotational speed range and temperature range of the additives' application); anti-foam additives and anti-oxidation compounds to inhibit oxidation and "boil-off" (which extends the life of the additives' application); cold-flow improvers, high-temperature thickeners, gasket conditioners, pour point depressant and petroleum dye. All ATFs contain friction modifiers, except for those ATFs specified for some Ford transmissions and the John Deere J-21A specification; the Ford ESP (or ESW) - M2C-33 F specification Type F ATF (Ford-O-Matic) and Ford ESP (or ESW) - M2C-33 G specification Type G ATF (1980s Ford Europe and Japan) specifically excludes the addition of friction modifiers. According to the same oil distributor, the M2C-33 G specification requires fluids which provide improved shear resistance and oxidation protection, better low-temperature fluidity, better EP (extreme pressure) properties and additional seal tests over and above M2C-33 F quality fluids.

Note that the friction modifier only means that the fluid sticks to the surface of the metal a little more strongly, and therefore only helps to prevent early wear. It would be required for Ford, BorgWarner to prove that their transmissions are somehow harmed by friction modifiers. In many countries, Ford have said that the modern Dex3 fluid is fine for the same transmissions that they say require the older standard.

There are many specifications for ATF, such as the General Motors (GM) DEXRON and the Ford MERCON series, and the vehicle manufacturer will identify the ATF specification appropriate for each vehicle. The vehicle's owner's manual will typically list the ATF specification(s) that are recommended by the manufacturer.

Automatic transmission fluids have many performance-enhancing chemicals added to the fluid to meet the demands of each transmission. Some ATF specifications are open to competing brands, such as the common DEXRON specification, where different manufacturers use different chemicals to meet the same performance specification. These products are sold under license from the OEM responsible for establishing the specification. Some vehicle manufacturers will require "genuine" or Original Equipment Manufacturer (OEM) ATF. Most ATF formulations are open 3rd party licensing, and certification by the automobile manufacturer.

Each manufacturer has specific ATF requirements. Incorrect transmission fluid may result in transmission malfunction or severe damage, however this occurs where the viscosity is extremely different.

Current fluids

DEXRON ULV - 2017 and above GM 10L90 10-speed automatic transmissions
MERCON ULV - 2017 and above Ford 10R80 10-speed automatic transmissions
DEXRON HP - 2013 and above GM 8L90 8-speed RWD automatic transmissions
Mopar ATF+4 - Most Dodge, Jeep, Chrysler, and Plymouth replaces ATF+3, ATF+2, ATF+
DEXRON III/MERCON - Most pre-2006 GM and Ford, Mercury, Lincoln, pre-2004 Toyota products, many Asian vehicles, some Asian power steering fluid applications, some Ford/Mazda manual transmissions. It is generally less expensive than DEXRON VI/MERCON V .
DEXRON VI - Most after 2006 GM, some Ford applications, replaces DEXRON III in GM automatic transmissions.
MERCON V - Most Ford, Mercury, Lincoln, Mazda B-Series, 2001-08 Mazda Tribute, Tribute Hybrid.
MERCON LV - Some Ford(DuratecHE), 2009-11 Mazda Tribute, Mazda in Europe or Asia.
Mercon SP - For the Ford 6R transmission
Toyota ATF Type T-IV (T4) - Some older Toyota, Lexus  including "Gen 1" hybrid CVT), some Mazda. Replaces Type T, and Type T-II (There was no Type T-III).
Toyota ATF WS - Most new models introduced with model year 2004 Toyota and Lexus including "Gen 2" and later hybrid CVT (except non-hybrid CVT); Volvo. It is not applicable in applications requiring ATF Type T-IV.
Honda DW-1 - All Honda and Acura (except continuously variable transmission (CVT), replaces Z1 specification fluid
Diamond SP-III (or SP3) - Older Mitsubishi Motors (including older CVTs; Hyundai and Kia 4-speed automatic transmission.
Diamond SP-IV (or SP4) - All Hyundai and Kia 6-speed automatic transmission.
DiaQueen ATF-J3 - Most Mitsubishi Motors 6-speed automatic transmissions.
Nissan Matic fluids - For Nissan and Infiniti vehicles:
Matic D is for 3- and 4-speed transmissions,
Matic K is for 6-speed front-wheel-drive transmissions,
Matic J is for 5-speed rear-wheel-drive transmissions,
Matic-S fluid supersedes Matic-J fluid.
ATF-HP - For 2005 and later Subaru vehicles, except CVTs. 2004 and earlier Subaru vehicles use DEXRON III.
Mazda M5 (MV) fluid - For the Mazda FN4A-EL/Ford 4F27E and Mazda FS5A-EL/Ford FNR5. Also sold as Ford FNR5 fluid. Genuine Mazda M5 is made by Idemitsu Kosan, available as Idemitsu Type-M. This fluid is NOT MERCON V.
Mazda FZ fluid - For the SKYACTIV-Drive. Color of this fluid is blue.

Synthetic ATF is available in modern OEM and aftermarket brands, offering better performance and service life for certain applications (such as frequent trailer towing).

The use of a lint-free white rag to wipe the dipstick on automatic transmissions is advised so that the color of the fluid can be checked. Dark brown or black ATF can be an indicator of a transmission problem, vehicle abuse, or fluid that has far exceeded its useful life. Over-used ATF often has reduced lubrication properties and abrasive friction materials (from clutches and brake bands) suspended in it; failure to replace such fluid will accelerate transmission wear and could eventually ruin an otherwise healthy transmission. However, color alone is not a completely reliable indication of the service life of ATF as most ATF products will darken with use. The manufacturer's recommended service interval is a more reliable measure of ATF life. In the absence of service or repair records, fluid color is a common means of gauging ATF service life.

CVTs and dual-clutch transmissions often use specialized fluids.
Transfer cases and differentials in four-wheel-drive/all-wheel-drive vehicles sometimes require specialized fluids, such as Honda Dual Pump-II, Honda VTM-4, Jeep Quadra-Trac, etc.

History

The history of automatic transmission fluids parallels the history of automatic transmission technology. The world's first mass-produced automatic transmission, the Hydra-Matic 4-speed, was developed by General Motors (GM) for the 1940 model year. The Hydra-Matic transmission required a special lubricant GM called Transmission Fluid No. 1. for the Hydra-Matic Drive. This transmission fluid was only available at Oldsmobile, Pontiac, and Cadillac dealerships. Subsequent automatic transmission and fluid coupling technologies, and difficulties with fluids in cold and hot temperature extremes led to a need for longer lasting, higher quality transmission fluids. Additionally, a better system of automatic transmission fluid distribution and marketing was necessary for the long term success of the automatic transmission.

In 1949, GM released a new Type "A" fluid specification. In an attempt to make GM automatic transmission fluid available at retailers and service garages everywhere. Every automatic transmission produced by any vehicle manufacturer used GM Type "A" transmission fluids in their transmissions from 1949-1958.

In 1959, Ford began releasing their own automatic transmission fluid specifications, see MERCON for more information. From 1958-1968 many vehicle manufacturers continued to use the next GM automatic transmission fluid specification, the Type "A" Suffix "A" fluid in their transmissions. In 1966, Chrysler began releasing their own automatic transmission fluid specifications, see Mopar ATF for more information. GM ATF was the same color as engine oil through 1967. Aftermarket ATF was available with red dye as an aid in fluid leak detection. Dexron (B) was the first GM ATF to require red dye.

In the 1940s, 1950s, 1960s, and early 1970s, ATF contained whale oil as a rust and corrosion inhibitor. A moratorium on whale oil at that time prevented the continued production of older ATF such as the original 1967 DEXRON formulation (Type B), and the fluids which preceded it. Vintage GM (1940-1967), Ford (1951-1967, and Chrysler products (1953-1966) used GM Type A fluid or GM Type A Suffix A fluids; these fluids are no longer produced. GM recommends Dexron-VI fluid, Ford recommends Mercon V fluid, and Chrysler recommends ATF+4 fluids for vintage transmission use.

Through the late 1970s, Ford transmissions were factory filled with a fluid identified as ESW M2C33-F. To provide a fluid that would be available to the general public for service fill, oil companies and other than factory fill suppliers were allowed to develop fluids meeting the ESW M2C33-F specification and market these fluids under their own brand names but identified as Type F.

The second generation of transmission fluid was released in 1974 as the factory fill specification, ESW M2C138-CJ. This fluid was developed to modify the vehicle shifting characteristics and to provide considerable improvement in the oxidation resistance and anti-wear performance.

No service fluids were developed and for a short time, DEXRON fluids approved by General Motors were considered acceptable.
With continuing changes and improvements in transmission design, a centrifugal lock-up torque converter clutch was introduced into the C5 transmission to smooth engine vibrations sensed by the occupant of the vehicle. An associated shudder problem forced the introduction of the factory fill specification ESP M2C166-H. Servicing transmissions with DEXRON fluids was unacceptable since not all DEXRON fluids were capable of eliminating the shudder phenomenon. The fluids that could be used were a subset of the DEXRON fluids. The advent of Type H as factory fill necessitated the development of a service fluid specification to match the performance expected from Type H. This resulted in the release of the MERCON specification in 1987.

One major revision occurred in September 1992, when low-temperature viscosity requirements, volatility requirements, viscosity change limits after high-temperature exposure and improved oxidation limits were introduced. These changes raised the performance of MERCON fluids above ESP M2C166-H levels.

The development of modulating and continuous slipping clutch converters has prompted the need to develop the MERCON V specification. Included are requirements to verify the anti-wear capabilities and anti-shudder characteristics of the fluid.

The MERCON V specification was further modified some time prior to 2007 to make it backward-compatible with MERCON. Ford has / is terminating all license agreements for the manufacture and sale of MERCON in favor of MERCON V.

Toyota continued using GM ATF, including Dexron (B) and Dexron-II(D) in most of their automatic transmissions until 2003. In 1988, Toyota began releasing their own automatic transmission fluid specifications, see Toyota ATF for more information.

"Lifetime" Fluids
In 1967, Ford produced the Type-F fluid specification. The Type-F specification was intended to produce a “lifetime” fluid which would never need to be changed. This was the first of many Ford “lifetime” fluids. The 1974 Ford Car Shop Manual reads "The automatic transmission is filled at the factory with "lifetime" fluid. If it is necessary to add or replace fluid, use only fluids which meet Ford Specification M2C33F. Many other transmission manufacturers have followed with their own "Lifetime" automatic transmission fluids".

How ATF Can Last a "Lifetime" 
To understand how a fluid can last a "lifetime", a study of the 1939 Chrysler Fluid Drive Fluid is helpful. The lesson learned by Chrysler with its fluid drives is applicable to modern automatic transmissions as well. The November 1954 edition of Lubrication Magazine (Published by The Texas Company, later known as Texaco) featured a story called "Evolution of the Chrysler PowerFlite Automatic Transmission". This article described the fluid used in the 1939 Chrysler Fluid Drive and its subsequent revisions and enhancements through 1954. <blockquote>

The fluid drive fluid coupling is partially filled with Mopar Fluid Drive Fluid, a special highly refined straight mineral oil with a viscosity of about 185 SUS at 100° F., excellent inherent oxidation stability, high viscosity index (100), excellent ability to rapidly reject air, very low natural pour point (-25° F.), ability to adequately lubricate the pilot ball bearing and seal surface, and neutrality towards the seal bellows.

The fluid operates under almost ideal conditions in what is essentially a hermetically sealed case, the small amount of atmospheric oxygen initially present is removed by a harmless reaction with the fluid so as to leave a residual inert (nitrogen) atmosphere. As a consequence, it has not been necessary to drain and replace the fluid, and the level-check recommendation has been successively extended from the original 2,500 miles to 15,500 miles and finally to "never" - or the life of the car.Since drains and level checks were not only unnecessary but frequently harmful (through the introduction of more air, and seal-destroying dirt) Chrysler eventually left off the tempting level inspection plugs. This mechanism is, therefore, one of the very few that are actually lubricated for the life of the car. There are now myriad examples of couplings that have operated well over 100,000 miles without any attention whatsoever and were still in perfect condition when the car was retired.</blockquote>

On European type cars, a „Lifetime“ means 180,000 km or 112,000 miles as a lifetime of a vehicle or transmission. Service intervals of newer type cars are from 80,000 to 120,000 km which equals 50,000 to 75,000 miles. Flushing or refilling the fluid on lifetime filled transmissions require to use equipment to fill from below, engaging the transmissions torque converter or using an external pump.More times described experience by leading masters of automotive service business which are recognized as instructors and masters of the Cologne guild, but also work as infuencers of their business.

 Sealed Transmissions 

Any automatic transmission fluid will last longer if the transmission case could be hermetically sealed, but transmissions typically have two potential entry points for air:
 The Dipstick Tube. Any transmission with a dipstick tube has the potential to let additional oxygen into the transmission through a dipstick that is not fully seated in the tube, or dipstick tube plug that is not fully seated. Even the process of checking the fluid level with a dipstick can allow additional oxygen and dirt into the transmission. Many modern transmissions do not have a dipstick, they have sealed transmission fluid level check plugs instead. By removing the traditional dipstick, the transmission manufacturer has also removed a potential entry point for oxygen; this reduces the potential for fluid oxidation. A sealed transmission will typically have longer transmission fluid life than a non-sealed transmission.
 The Transmission Vent. Transmissions need vents to compensate for internal air pressure changes that occur with fluctuating fluid temperatures and fluctuating fluid levels during transmission operation. Without those vents, pressure could build resulting in seal and gasket leaks. Before the use of better quality base oil in ATF in the late 1990s, some older transmission breather vents contained a Transmission Air Breathing Suppressor (TABS) valve to prevent oxygen and water ingestion into their transmissions. Oxygen reacts with high-temperature transmission fluid and can cause oxidation, rust, and corrosion. Automatic transmission fluids using lower quality base oil oxidized more easily than fluids using higher quality base oils. Transmission manufacturers now use smaller, remote mounted, breather vents specially designed to keep out water, but allow a small amount of air movement through the breather as necessary.

 Sealed ATF Containers 
Any automatic transmission fluid will last longer if it comes from an unopened container
 Use Sealed Containers. Containers storing automatic transmission fluid (ATF) should always be sealed; if exposed to the atmosphere, ATF may absorb moisture and potentially cause shift concerns.
 Use New Fluid Only. When performing repairs on ATF equipped transmissions, it is important to use only new, clean ATF when refilling the transmission. Never reuse ATF.

 Example Maintenance Schedule 

Lifetime automatic transmission fluids made from higher quality base oil and an additive package are more chemically stable, less reactive, and do not experience oxidation as easily as lower quality fluids made from lower quality base oil and an additive package. Therefore, higher quality transmission fluids can last a long time in normal driving conditions (Typically 100,000 miles (160,000 km) or more).

The definition of 'Lifetime Fluid" differs from transmission manufacturer to transmission manufacturer. Always consult the vehicle maintenance guide for the proper service interval for the fluid in your transmission and your driving conditions.

Chevrolet Colorado Example: According to the Scheduled Maintenance Guide of a 2018 Chevrolet Colorado with "Lifetime Fluid" could have two different fluid service intervals depending upon how the vehicle is driven:

 1. Normal Driving   
 Carry passengers and cargo within recommended limits on the Tire and Loading Information label
 Driven on reasonable road surfaces within legal driving limits.

 2. Severe Driving 
 Mainly driven in heavy city traffic in hot weather
 Mainly driven in hilly or mountainous terrain
 Frequently towing a trailer
 Used for high speed or competitive driving
 Used for taxi, police, or delivery service. 
Under "Severe" driving conditions, replace automatic transmission fluid and filter every 45,000 mi (72,420 km)

Aftermarket Automatic Transmission Fluids

For over 70 years, the oil aftermarket has produced both licensed, and non-licensed, formulations of automatic transmission fluids (ATF).https://www.api.org/products-and-services/engine-oil/unauthorized-use-of-api-certification-marks| Unauthorized Use of API Certification Marks Today, aftermarket fluids asserted by their manufacturers to be compatible for use in various brands of automatic transmissions continue to be sold under names such as Multi-Purpose and Multi-Vehicle fluids. Non-licensed fluid is typically less expensive; these fluids are not regulated or endorsed by the vehicle manufacturer for use in their transmissions. Vehicle manufacturer approved and licensed fluids must have the license number printed on the product information label of the container or on the container housing. Non-Licensed fluids do not show a license number. Make sure the fluid to be installed into a transmission matches the recommended fluid in the specifications section of the vehicle's owner's manual.

Mislabeled or Misleading Labeling on ATF Containers
ATF which has been mislabeled, has misleading labeling, or is fraudulently bottled as another product is an ongoing problem. Some of these fluids have led to multiple transmission failures.  The three organizations shown below are trying to stop this problem in the United States.

 United States Laws: The U.S. Department of Commerce, National Institute of Standards and Technology (NIST), Handbook 130 2019 Edition, contains Uniform Laws and Regulations in the Areas of Legal Metrology and Fuel Quality. Section IV.G.3.14 defines laws regulating the Labeling and Identification of Transmission Fluid. Paragraph IV.G.3.14.1.1. Container Labeling. reads The label on a container of transmission fluid shall not contain any information that is false or misleading.''
 California Laws: The State of California has developed additional Laws in an attempt to prevent mislabeled and misleading labeling. Statutes: California Business and Professions Code, Division 5, Chapters 6, 14, 14.5, and 15. Regulations: California Code of Regulation, Title 4, Division 9, Chapters 6 and 7.
 American Petroleum Institute (API) Monitoring: The American Petroleum Institute (API) maintains a list of invalid labeling of petroleum products. This real-time list includes motor oils and ATF.

See also
 GM DEXRON automatic transmission fluids
 Ford MERCON automatic transmission fluids

References

External links
 A Look at Changes in Automatic Transmission Fluid
The History of Automatic Transmission Fluid - ATF History Part 1 
Changing Gears: The Development of the Automotive Transmission
World's First Mass Produced Automatic Transmission - Part 1- Introduction and History

Automotive chemicals
Automobile transmissions
Petroleum based lubricants
Oils